Jersey Mike's Arena, commonly known as the RAC (an initialism for Rutgers Athletic Center, its former official name), is an 8,000-seat multi-purpose arena in Piscataway, New Jersey on Rutgers University's Livingston Campus. The building is shaped like a truncated tent with trapezoidal sides on the north and south ends.  It is home to the men's and women's Rutgers Scarlet Knights basketball teams as well as the wrestling and gymnastics teams.  Previously, the university used the 3,200-seat College Avenue Gym from 1931 to 1977.

History
The arena opened on November 30, 1977, with a win against rival Seton Hall.

The arena was known as the Rutgers Athletic Center until 1986, when it was renamed for Louis Brown, a Rutgers graduate and former member of the varsity golf team, who made a large bequest to the university in his will.  Despite the name change, the building was still largely referred to as "The RAC" (pronounced "rack") by students, alumni, fans, and players.

In 2019, all references to Louis Brown were removed from the arena and all university websites, which resumed using the arena's original name, "The Rutgers Athletic Center." In 2021, the arena was renamed Jersey Mike's Arena, after selling its naming rights.

Reputation

The RAC is renowned for being one of the loudest arenas in college basketball when at maximum capacity. The trapezoidal design of the building allows the crowd noise to resonate, creating a deafening environment. The RAC has even been described as being "louder than a 747 at Newark Airport."

ESPN's Jay Bilas has lauded the RAC, saying, "The Scarlet Knights play great there, and the crowd is right on top of you and intimidating."

Former opponents have also extolled the RAC's atmosphere.  Former Connecticut Guard Ben Gordon said, "It is very difficult at the RAC.  They have a great home crowd.  The student body and everybody really comes out to support them.  Just the way the gym is shaped, it seems like everybody is on top of you. At times, if you're not focused, you can get lost in the game just by how intense the crowd is."

Former Syracuse forward Hakim Warrick  notes that "they (the fans) are definitely some of the best fans on the road that I’ve played against. It's crazy how much they love their team. The way the gym is made, it's just made to keep the noise in. It's loud and crazy down there."

Non-Rutgers sporting events

The arena was the home of the NBA's New Jersey Nets from their second year in the NBA, 1977, when the team moved from the Nassau Veterans Memorial Coliseum in Uniondale, New York, until 1981, when the Brendan Byrne Arena opened at the Meadowlands Sports Complex.  It also hosted the 1985 and 1989 Atlantic 10 Conference men's basketball tournaments. The arena is also the site for the girls and boys Middlesex County high school basketball tournament finals, and various boys and girls New Jersey high school basketball state playoff games. On Saturday April 13, 1996, a Professional Bowler's Association tournament was broadcast live from the arena on ABC, the Johnny Petraglia Open.

Non-sporting events

Concerts
The Grateful Dead played at the Rutgers Athletic Center on May 15, 1981. Styx brought their Grand Illusion to the RAC on October 24, 1979. Linda Ronstadt also played here on her "Living in the USA" tour and sang with a terrible sore throat. Also, Linda Ronstadt played the RAC on April 11, 1980 for her "Mad Love" tour, and on October 22, 1987, R.E.M. played the RAC with 10,000 Maniacs opening. On April 25, 1980, Frank Zappa played a show at the RAC. 

The arena was used on Friday, April 27, 2007 for Rutgersfest, an annual concert normally held outdoors, but held in the RAC that time due to rain.  The performers were The Roots, Hawthorne Heights, and Everclear.  Due to lack of seating, only 5,000 tickets were given out, angering the 15,000 or so (est.) other students who were then unable to attend.

May 3, 2008 The RAC hosted SpringBlaze 2008, a concert featuring Christian rock bands with a special appearance by Rutgers Football Head Coach Greg Schiano.

Other events
On December 2, 1983, a local nonprofit, Visions-Innervisions Productions, hosted a fundraiser for Headstart and other community services at the RAC beginning with the annual university Step-Show, viewing the debut of Michael Jackson's Thriller on 20' screens, one above each hoop, followed by Motown's D-Train, live.

The arena is used every June as a graduation hall for J. P. Stevens High School, Edison High School, Piscataway Township High School, and North Brunswick Township High School, as well as for other high schools in surrounding cities.  The graduations are free for anyone to attend.

Starting in 2014, Rutgers University Dance Marathon is held at the RAC, having moved from the College Avenue Gym.

Possible expansion
In 2010, the Newark, New Jersey-based Star-Ledger and the Rutgers University newspaper, The Daily Targum have reported that former Rutgers Athletic Director Tim Pernetti planned to expand the Louis Brown Athletic Center to include more practice facilities, more concourse space, and a seating expansion to accommodate 12,500 fans, including club seating and premium restaurants. Pernetti also stated that he wanted to book more concerts at the arena and at nearby Rutgers Stadium.

When the Scarlet Knights joined the Big Ten Conference in 2014, the RAC was the smallest arena in conference, with slightly fewer seats than the 8,117 that Northwestern's Welsh–Ryan Arena sat at the time. However, after the renovations of Welsh-Ryan during the 2017–18 season, in which the listed capacity was decreased, Welsh-Ryan Arena is now smaller, making the RAC the second-smallest arena in the conference. The other twelve Big Ten schools' arenas all seat at least 12,500.

See also

 List of NCAA Division I basketball arenas

References

Sports venues completed in 1977
College basketball venues in the United States
Basketball venues in New Jersey
New Jersey Nets arenas
Rutgers Scarlet Knights basketball venues
Former National Basketball Association venues
1977 establishments in New Jersey
Piscataway, New Jersey